The Law of Lombardy is a 1779 tragedy by the Irish writer Robert Jephson.

The original Drury Lane cast included William Smith as Paladore, Robert Bensley as King, John Hayman Packer as Rinaldo, Richard Hurst as Asciano, James Wrighten as Forester, Mary Robinson as Alinda and Elizabeth Younge as Princess.

References

Bibliography
 Nicoll, Allardyce. A History of English Drama 1660–1900: Volume III. Cambridge University Press, 2009.
 Hogan, C.B (ed.) The London Stage, 1660–1800: Volume V. Southern Illinois University Press, 1968.

1779 plays
Tragedy plays
West End plays
Plays by Robert Jephson